Zaporizhzhia International Airport  is the international airport that serves Zaporizhzhia, Ukraine, one of three airfields around the city. The aircraft engine factory Motor Sich has its base here. In May 2020, the airport was extended with a new terminal with  a capacity of 400 passengers. The airport is also home to the Zaporizhzhya State Aircraft Repair Plant (ZDARZ).

History of the airport 

 the date of the airport's establishment is 15 October 1943. Immediately after the release of Zaporizhzhia from the Nazi troops, an order No. 1 was issued for the enterprise according to which the first head of the Zaporizhzhia airport was appointed. At that time, the airport infrastructure was located on the eastern outskirts of the city;
 after the end of the war in 1945, the airport began to operate flights between Zaporizhzhia-Moscow-Zaporizhzhia, and then Zaporizhzhia-Kyiv-Zaporizhzhia;
 in 1964, an artificial runway was put into operation at the current location of the airport;

 in 1965, the construction of the airport terminal was completed Airport building in the 1960s;
 until the beginning of the 1990s, the airport was rapidly developing; in 70–80 years, up to 150 flights were carried out, which linked several dozen cities of the then existing USSR;
 in 1981, the last time in the 20th century, a major overhaul of the runway at the airport was carried out;
 in the 1990s, a significant decline in airport production rates was recorded. This happened in the face of the extremely difficult economic and political situation in the country;

During the 1990s and early 2000s, the airport did not actually evolve due to lack of own funds and lack of financial assistance from the state or private investors.

Current airport 
The situation began to change in 2013, when the airport changed its ownership form, and then it was transferred to the local territorial community. At the session of the Municipal Council, the Municipal target program "Ensuring proper and uninterrupted work of the Utility Enterprise "Zaporizhzhia International Airport" was approved. It was this year that there was a significant increase in airport production rates. In particular, an increase of 30.1% of adopted aircraft was registered (a total of 1936 units), as well as an increase in passenger traffic by 40.6% (to 79 845 passengers). In the same year, three intro-scopes for the inspection of baggage of passengers as well as a ring carrier for baggage delivery were purchased.

From 2015, the airport began to actively cooperate with major international and Ukrainian carriers – in particular, Turkish Airlines, Pegasus Airlines and AtlasGlobal.

In 2016, the Zaporizhzhia Municipal Council and the airport management developed and began to implement airport development and maintenance measures. For this purpose, UAH 12.5 million from the city budget and UAH 19.6 million from the airport's own funds were spent. A major repair of the terminal for domestic airlines has been completed, repairs of the terminal for international airlines have been completed, projects for the reconstruction of the lightning navigational aids of the runway and radio equipment have been completed, several units of necessary equipment have been purchased. In the same year, an agreement on cooperation with the "International Airlines of Ukraine" was signed, and the airport was recognized as the best airport in Ukraine. In February, the airport was included in the State Target Program for the Development of Airports for the period up to 2023. In its framework it is planned to allocate more than US$611 million for the airport support.

In 2017, the contracts were signed with Anda Air and Bravo Airlines. Also this year the first major repairs of the runway for 36 years were carried out, about 20 million UAH were spent on repairs.

In 2018, the enterprise management will join the cooperation of one of the largest European carriers – LOT Polish Airlines. Due to this, for the first time in the history of Zaporizhzhia the regular flights to the countries of Europe began to operate from the local airport. The first of these was the Zaporizhzhia-Warsaw flight. The Ukrainian low-cost airline SkyUp became another new carrier that started cooperation with the airport. Also this year, the airport representatives are participating for the first time in the Routes Europe 2018 Forum, one of the largest air aviation forums in the world, allowing for meetings between the most influential players in the airline market.

2020 new terminal 
In 2016, the concept of a new terminal at the airport was presented. On 6 September 2017, the Government of Ukraine approved design estimates for the construction of a new passenger terminal. According to the documents, the construction should be completed within 24 months from the start date of construction, the total cost of all works, at the time of approval of the design and estimate documentation, amounted to 543 million UAH. Also, for the maintenance of the terminal, construction of a boiler house, a pumping station, a complex transformer substation, supply of power grids, sewage networks, water supply, heat and gas supply, communication systems, and rainwater drainage is planned. The construction of a new terminal should significantly increase the volume of passenger traffic and allow significant development of the transport infrastructure of the entire region. The executor of the work was the company "Altis-Construction", which won the tender with a proposal of 529 million 850 thousand UAH.

On 14 December 2017, the construction of a new terminal began. Its area is 12,545 m2, the capacity should be 400 passengers per hour (250 on international lines and 150 on domestic ones).  The start of the construction of a new airport terminal in Zaporizhzhia.

On 14 December 2018, the airport was authorized to take a loan from state-owned banks amounting to 280 million UAH. This money should be directed to construction work at the new airport terminal. An enterprise must return the sum at the expense of its own profit. The state of construction of the new terminal of the airport as of February 2019. At the end of 2018, a completely built terminal framework and work on the roof covering was completed. The work on the installation of glass panels are coming to the end. The laying of communications to the terminal building continues. The installation of escalators has begun. According to official data, on 17 December 2018, 50% of all construction works were completed. The terminal rated capacity will be 1 million passengers per year.

On 13 May 2020, the new terminal was completed, but due to the worldwide COVID-19 pandemic, it was not yet opened. On 19 October 2020, the new terminal was opened for internal Flights. The first flight went to Kyiv operated by SkyUp Airlines. International flights were scheduled to begin on 20 October 2020.

On 24 February 2022, Ukraine closed airspace to civilian flights due to Russian invasion of Ukraine.

Airlines and destinations
The following airlines operate regular scheduled and charter services at the airport:

As of 24 February 2022, all passenger flights have been suspended indefinitely.

Statistics

See also
 List of airports in Ukraine
 List of the busiest airports in Ukraine
 List of the busiest airports in Europe
 List of the busiest airports in the former USSR

References

External links

 Official website
 

Airports in Ukraine
Buildings and structures in Zaporizhzhia